The tables list the Ollywood films in Odia released in theaters in the year 2019. Premiere shows and film festival screenings are not considered as releases for this list. 
A list of films produced by the Ollywood film industry and released and scheduled to be released in theaters in 2019.

Released films

January – April

References 

2019
Ollywood
Ollywood